The following table shows the progression of world bests and world records in the 5K run, as recognised by the IAAF. The 5K run is a new event, having been introduced as a world record event in 2017.

Men

World Bests (prior to IAAF recognition)

World Records

Key:

Women

World Bests (prior to IAAF recognition)

World Records

Notes

References

5 km
5K runs